Jón Sigurðsson (born 17 April 1941) is an Icelandic politician and former minister. He was a member of parliament from 1987 to 1993 and served as the Minister of Justice and Ecclesiastical Affairs from 1987 to 1988 and the Minister of Industry and Commerce from 1988 to 1993. After leaving parliament, he was the Governor of the Central Bank of Iceland from 1993 to 1994.

References

External links 
 Official biography of Jón Sigurðsson on the parliament website

|-

|-

|-

Jon Sigurdsson
1941 births
Living people
Governors of the Central Bank of Iceland
Bank presidents and chief executive officers
Jon Sigurdsson